Armenia competed at the 1998 Winter Paralympics in Nagano, Japan. 8 competitors from Armenia won no medals and so did not place in the medal table.

See also 
 Armenia at the Paralympics
 Armenia at the 1998 Winter Olympics

References 

Armenia at the Paralympics
Nations at the 1998 Winter Paralympics
1998 in Armenian sport